is a lighthouse on Cape Nosappu in Nemuro, Hokkaidō, Japan.

History

The lighthouse was one of those designed by Richard Henry Brunton who was hired by the government of Japan to help construct lighthouses at the beginning of the Meiji period to make Japan safe for foreign ships.

Access

The site is open to the public, and can be accessed by car or by public transportation.  By public transportation, it is accessible by bus from Nemuro Station.

Gallery

See also

 List of lighthouses in Japan

References

External links

 Information for visitors 

Lighthouses completed in 1872
Lighthouses in Japan
Buildings and structures in Hokkaido
Tourist attractions in Hokkaido
Articles containing video clips